Jan Svensson may refer to:

Harpo (singer) (born 1950), moniker for Swedish singer Jan Svensson
Jan Svensson (footballer, born 1944), Swedish footballer
Jan Svensson (footballer, born 1956), Swedish footballer